Serge Bayonne (born 31 October 1970) is a Gabonese footballer. He played in ten matches for the Gabon national football team from 1994 to 1996. He was also named in Gabon's squad for the 1996 African Cup of Nations tournament.

References

External links
 

1970 births
Living people
Gabonese footballers
Gabon international footballers
1996 African Cup of Nations players
Place of birth missing (living people)
Association football defenders
21st-century Gabonese people